Henry Shaw (1788 – October 17, 1857) was a U.S. Representative from Massachusetts, son of Samuel Shaw.

Life
Born near Putney, Vermont, Shaw completed preparatory studies.  He studied law, was admitted to the bar and commenced practice in Albany, New York, in 1810. He moved to Lanesboro, Massachusetts, in 1813.

Shaw was elected as a Democratic-Republican to the 15th and 16th United States Congresses, holding office from March 4, 1817, to March 3, 1821. He served as member of the Massachusetts House of Representatives from 1824 to 1830 and 1833, and served in the Massachusetts State Senate in 1835.

He was an unsuccessful candidate for Governor of Massachusetts in 1845 and moved to New York City in 1848. He was a member of that city's Board of Education, and was a member of the Common Council.  He was a member of the New York State Assembly (New York Co., 10th D.) in 1853. Shaw moved to Newburgh, New York in 1854, and died in Peekskill, New York on October 17, 1857.  He was interred in the Lower Cemetery, Lanesboro, Massachusetts.

His son Henry Wheeler Shaw (1818–1885) became a well-known humorist under the pen name Josh Billings.

References

1788 births
1857 deaths
Democratic Party members of the New York State Assembly
Members of the Massachusetts House of Representatives
Massachusetts state senators
Democratic-Republican Party members of the United States House of Representatives from Massachusetts
19th-century American politicians